Daniel Sakari Macheso (born 25 January 1999) is a Kenyan footballer who plays as a right back for Kariobangi Sharks and the Kenya national football team.

Early life and education
Sakari was born in Mathare North in Nairobi County but grew up in Webuye, Bungoma County. Sakari was educated at Milo Central Academy and Maseno School before studying at Masinde Muliro University of Science and Technology. He graduated from the university with an undergraduate degree in statistics and pure mathematics.

Club career
Despite playing rugby while attending Maseno School, Sakari joined his university team (MMUST FC) in 2017, before switching to Green Commandoes in 2018. He switched to Kakamega Homeboyz towards the end of 2018, before signing with Kariobangi Sharks in 2019.

International career
Sakari was first called up to the Kenya national football team in November 2019.

References

External links

Living people
1999 births
Kenyan footballers
Kenya international footballers
People from Bungoma County
Association football fullbacks
Kakamega Homeboyz F.C. players
F.C. Kariobangi Sharks players
Kenyan Premier League players